Multanovo is a rural locality (a selo) and the administrative center of Multanovsky Selsoviet of Volodarsky District, Astrakhan Oblast, Russia. The population was 1,170 as of 2010. There are 21 streets.

Geography 
Multanovo is located 24 km southeast of Volodarsky (the district's administrative centre) by road. Sarmantayevka is the nearest rural locality.

References 

Rural localities in Volodarsky District, Astrakhan Oblast